The ninth term of the Sejm of the Republic of Poland is the current term of the Sejm that has run from 13 November 2019.

Officers

Members of Sejm

mandates expired during the term of office

See also
 2019 Polish parliamentary election
 List of Polish senators (2019–23)

References

 
Poland,Sejm,2019